Maine School Administrative District 75 operates six elementary schools (K–5), one middle school (6–8)  and one high school (9–12) in Cumberland and Sagadahoc Counties in the U.S. state of Maine. The district has 266 teachers (FTEs) serving 3,444 students.

Schools

References

External links
 

75
Education in Cumberland County, Maine
Education in Sagadahoc County, Maine